West Virginia Route 54 is a north–south state highway located in southern West Virginia. The southern terminus of the route is at West Virginia Route 16 in Mullens. The northern terminus is at WV 16 and West Virginia Route 97 in Sophia.

Major intersections

References

054
Transportation in Raleigh County, West Virginia
Transportation in Wyoming County, West Virginia